Polgara may mean:

 Polgara the Sorceress, a 1997 novel by David and Leigh Eddings, and the main character in this and other books by the same authors
 Polgara, a type of demon in the Buffy the Vampire Slayer universe

See also
 Polgár (disambiguation)
 Polara (disambiguation)